Nazanin Bayati (Persian: نازنین بیاتی; born January 5, 1990) is an Iranian actress. She made her feature film debut in Parviz Shahbazi's Trapped (2013). For her performance in the film, she earned a Crystal Simorgh and a Hafez Award nomination.

Early life 
Nazanin Bayati is a theater graduate of Tonekabon Islamic Azad University.

Nazanin Bayati shone in her first film appearance in Darband and was nominated for Crystal Simorgh for Best Actress in a Leading Role at the 31st Fajr International Film Festival. She also won the statuette for the best comedy actress from the 19th Hafez Festival for her role in Golshifteh's home drama series.

Nazanin Bayati appeared in the Shakeristan puppet TV series as a stage designer, costume designer, and voice actor for the characters of "Dream and Prophet" with Hassan Radfar.

Filmography

Film

Home show

Awards and nominations

References

External links 
 
 
 Nazanin Bayati on the CNET website

1990 births
Living people
Actresses from Tehran
Iranian film actresses
Iranian stage actresses
Islamic Azad University alumni